Campbell Logan (1910–1978) was a British television producer and director. He produced a large number of serials for the BBC, often based on classic works of literature.

Selected filmography
 BBC Sunday-Night Theatre (1950-1959)
 The Warden (1951)
 Ann Veronica (1952)
 Jane Eyre (1956)
 Vanity Fair (1956)
 Precious Bane (1957)
 The Royalty (1957-1958)
 Charlesworth (1959)
 The Naked Lady (1959)
 Emma (1960)
 Persuasion (1960)
 The Men from Room 13 (1961)
 Dr. Finlay's Casebook (1962-1964)
 Kidnapped (1963)
 The Count of Monte Cristo (1964)
 Martin Chuzzlewit (1964)
 Smuggler's Bay (1964)
 Rupert of Hentzau (1964)
 Alexander Graham Bell (1965)
 Poison Island (1965)
 Heiress of Garth (1965)
 Hereward the Wake (1965)
 Silas Marner (1965)
 A Tale of Two Cities (1965)
 David Copperfield (1966)
 The Queen's Traitor (1967)
 Pride and Prejudice (1967)
 Les Misérables (1967)
 St. Ives (1967)
 Great Expectations (1967)
 Treasure Island (1968)
 The Railway Children (1968)
 The £1,000,000 Bank Note (1968)
 The Man in the Iron Mask (1968)
 Nicholas Nickleby (1968)
 Dombey and Son (1969)
 The Elusive Pimpernel (1969)
 Ivanhoe (1970)

References

Bibliography 
 Mary Hammond. Charles Dickens's Great Expectations: A Cultural Life, 1860–2012. Routledge, 2016.
 Andrew J. MacDonald & Gina MacDonald. Jane Austen on Screen. Cambridge University Press, 2003.

External links 
 

1910 births
1978 deaths
British television producers
British television directors
People from Lanarkshire
20th-century British businesspeople